The 2004 Wismilak International was a women's tennis tournament played on outdoor hard courts in Bali, Indonesia that was part of the Tier III category of the 2004 WTA Tour. It was the tenth edition of the tournament and was held from 13 September through 19 September 2004. Second-seeded Svetlana Kuznetsova won the singles title and earned $35,000 first-prize money.

Finals

Singles

 Svetlana Kuznetsova defeated  Marlene Weingärtner, 6–1, 6–4
 It was Kuznetsova's 3rd singles title of the year and the 5th of her career.

Doubles

 Anastasia Myskina /  Ai Sugiyama defeated  Svetlana Kuznetsova /  Arantxa Sánchez Vicario, 6–3, 7–5

References

External links
 ITF tournament edition details
 Tournament draws

Wismilak International
Commonwealth Bank Tennis Classic
2004 in Indonesian tennis